U.S. Highway 63 (US 63) is a north-south U.S. highway that begins in Ruston, LA. In the US state of Arkansas the highway enters the state from Louisiana concurrent with US 167 in Junction City. The highway runs north through the eastern part of the state, serving rural areas of South Arkansas and the Arkansas Delta, as well as Pine Bluff and Jonesboro. The highway exits the state at Mammoth Spring traveling into Missouri.

Route description
U.S. 63 enters into Arkansas from Louisiana concurrent with US 167 in Junction City. Just a few miles into the state, the two highways run on the eastern edge of El Dorado as an expressway. US 167 splits here, traveling towards Hampton. US 63 bypasses the town of Warren, crossing US 270. US 63 passes through the rural Cleveland County, then enters into Jefferson County.

In Jefferson County, US 63 serves the city of Pine Bluff. US 63 bypasses the city, running on the last 3 miles of I-530. Also in Pine Bluff, the highway overlaps with US 65 and US 79. US 63 runs northeast with US 79 until Stuttgart, where the highway runs north to Hazen. Just north of Hazen, US 63 overlaps with I-40 to Brinkley. In Brinkley, US 63 begins an overlap with US 49 north to Jonesboro. US 63 leaves US 49 and follows I-555 until I-555 terminates, together serving as a bypass for southern Jonesboro. In Hoxie, US 63 intersects with US 67 (Future I-57). Northwest of here near Portia the highway overlaps with US 412.

In Imboden US 62 joins this overlap. In Hardy, US 63 leaves the two highways. In Mammoth Spring, US 63 crosses into Missouri, traveling to West Plains.

History
Portions of U.S. 63 in northern Arkansas have their origins in the work of the Ozark Trails Association, which established a network of roads in northern Arkansas and southern Missouri beginning in the 1910s.  A portion of roadway was mapped out in Arkansas between Mammoth Spring and Memphis, Tennessee, and built c. 1918-22.  This roadway was eventually designated Highway A-7, and was later designated U.S. 63.  Some of the original infrastructure of this early construction has survived the 1927 Mississippi flood and the realignment of U.S. 63 in 1967.  Northwest of Tyronza, Old U.S. 63 runs for about 1-1/4 miles of original concrete pavement; it was listed on the National Register of Historic Places in 2009.  Four bridges built in the 1920s (three before the 1927 flood and one after, are also on the National Register; three southeast of Marked Tree, and one southeast of Tyronza.

In April 2019, ArDOT submitted an application to AASHTO to reroute US 63 concurrent with US 49 between Brinkley and Jonesboro, eliminating the concurrencies with I-40, I-55, and I-555. The rerouting took effect in 2021.

Major intersections

See also
Interstate 555
U.S. Route 63
National Register of Historic Places in Poinsett County, Arkansas

References

External links

Jonesboro, Arkansas
National Register of Historic Places in Poinsett County, Arkansas
Roads on the National Register of Historic Places in Arkansas
Transportation in Arkansas County, Arkansas
Transportation in Bradley County, Arkansas
Transportation in Cleveland County, Arkansas
Transportation in Craighead County, Arkansas
Transportation in Cross County, Arkansas
Transportation in Fulton County, Arkansas
Transportation in Greene County, Arkansas
Transportation in Jefferson County, Arkansas
Transportation in Lawrence County, Arkansas
Transportation in Monroe County, Arkansas
Transportation in Pine Bluff, Arkansas
Transportation in Poinsett County, Arkansas
Transportation in Prairie County, Arkansas
Transportation in Randolph County, Arkansas
Transportation in Sharp County, Arkansas
Transportation in Union County, Arkansas
Transportation in Woodruff County, Arkansas
63
 Arkansas